The 2013 European Darts Open was the third of eight PDC European Tour events on the 2013 PDC Pro Tour. The tournament took place at the Maritim Hotel in Düsseldorf, Germany, from 17–19 May 2013. It featured a field of 64 players and £100,000 in prize money, with £20,000 going to the winner.

Michael van Gerwen won his first European Tour title with a 6–2 defeat of Simon Whitlock in the final.

Prize money

Qualification
The top 32 players from the PDC ProTour Order of Merit on the 17 April 2013 automatically qualified for the event. The remaining 32 places went to players from three qualifying events - 20 from the UK Qualifier (held in Wigan on 26 April), eight from the European Qualifier and four from the Host Nation Qualifier (both held at the venue in Düsseldorf on 16 May).

1–32

UK Qualifier
  Dennis Smith (first round)
  Andy Parsons (second round)
  Stephen Hardy (first round)
  Darren Johnson (first round)
  Mark Cox (second round)
  Steve Beaton (first round)
  Mark Jones (first round)
  Prakash Jiwa (first round)
  Terry Temple (first round)
  Steve Maish (first round)
  Keith Stephen (first round)
  Alex Roy (second round)
  Chris Aubrey (first round)
  Paul Amos (first round)
  Kevin Dowling (first round)
  Kevin McDine (first round)
  David Pallett (first round)
  Matt Clark (first round)
  Adam Hunt (first round)
  Shaun Griffiths (first round)

European Qualifier
  Kurt van de Rijck (first round)
  Mareno Michels (first round)
  Bobby Biemans (first round)
  Maik Langendorf (first round)
  Mensur Suljović (first round)
  Ronny Huybrechts (first round)
  Jelle Klaasen (first round)
  Jerry Hendriks (first round)

Host Nation Qualifier
  Max Hopp (first round)
  Tomas Seyler (first round)
  Jyhan Artut (first round)
  Andree Welge (first round)

Draw

References

2013 PDC European Tour
2013 in German sport